Elena Pietrini (born 17 March 2000) is an Italian volleyball player who plays as a wing spiker for the Italian national team. She made her debut appearance at the Olympics representing Italy at the 2020 Summer Olympics.

Biography 
Her father Alberto Pietrini was a professional basketball player who played at club level and her mother Laura Pietrini and her sister Giulia Pietrini were also volleyball players.

Youth career 
She was part of the youth national team which emerged as runners-up to Russia at the 2017 Girls' U18 Volleyball European Championship. 

She was also a key member of the Italian U18 team which won the 2017 FIVB Volleyball Girls' U18 World Championship. For her tremendous performance during the 2017 FIVB Volleyball U18 World Championship she was awarded the MVP of the tournament. She also participated at the 2017 FIVB Volleyball Women's U20 World Championship where Italy finished at ninth position.

Senior career 
She was part of the Italian national team at the 2018 FIVB Volleyball Women's Nations League. She was also a member of the Italian squad which emerged as runner-up to Serbia at the 2018 FIVB Volleyball Women's World Championship.

She was also initially on the selection radar for the 2019 Women's European Volleyball Championship but she pulled out due to physical and mental fatigue. However, she competed at the 2019 FIVB Volleyball Women's Nations League. She was part of national side which claimed bronze medal at the 2019 Montreux Volley Masters.

She was included in the national squad to compete in the women's volleyball tournament at the 2020 Summer Olympics.

References

External links 

 FIVB profile
 CEV profile
 http://www.fivb.org/viewPressRelease.asp?No=72485&Language=en#.W51scaZKjIV

2000 births
Living people
Italian women's volleyball players
Volleyball players at the 2020 Summer Olympics
Olympic volleyball players of Italy
People from Imola
Sportspeople from the Metropolitan City of Bologna